The Mountain Empire is a rural area in southeastern San Diego County, California. The Mountain Empire subregion consists of the backcountry communities in southeastern San Diego County. The area is also sometimes considered part of the East County region of San Diego County.

Geography
The Mountain Empire occupies the largely hilly, rugged terrain of the Laguna Mountains and foothills between Interstate 8 and the U.S.-Mexico border east of Otay Mountain and west of Imperial County. Communities located just north of Interstate 8, such as Descanso, Guatay and Pine Valley, are generally included within the region, while those further north, such as Julian, are not. The Pacific Crest Trail has its southern terminus on the Mexican border near Campo. Portions of the Mountain Empire are located in the Descanso Ranger District of the Cleveland National Forest.

California State Route 94 and Interstate 8 are the primary highways through the region. Historic U.S. Route 80 also passes through the Mountain Empire, as does the now disused San Diego and Arizona Eastern Railway.

Communities

Census-designated places 
Populations are as of the 2020 census:
Campo - 2,955
Pine Valley - 1,645
Descanso -1,499
Potrero - 648
Jacumba Hot Springs - 540
Boulevard - 359
Mount Laguna - 74

Other unincorporated communities 
 Bankhead Springs
 Boulder Oaks
 Buckman Springs
 Dulzura
 Guatay
 Manzanita
 Tecate
 Tierra del Sol

Indian reservations 
Federally recognized tribes and bands of the Kumeyaay people have Indian reservations with communities in the Mountain Empire region and southern Laguna Mountains. They include (populations as of 2020 census):
 Campo Indian Reservation - 398
 Manzanita Band of Diegueño Mission Indians - 101
 La Posta Band of Diegueño Mission Indians - 50
 Ewiiaapaayp Band of Kumeyaay Indians - 5

The San Diego County Sheriff's Department provides patrol and law enforcement services to the Mountain Empire region.

Education
The region is served by the Mountain Empire Unified School District, which consists of six elementary schools and Mountain Empire High School. 

Media
The Mountain Empire is served by countywide publications such as the San Diego Union-Tribune and the San Diego Reader. Regionally, it is served by East County Magazine.

References

External links
Mountain Empire Subregional Plan
Back Country Messenger website
East County Magazine website

 

.
Cuyamaca Mountains
Laguna Mountains